St. Soldier Law College was established in Jalandhar in 2004. The college was established by the St. Soldier Educational Society. This Co-Ed College is affiliated to Guru Nanak Dev University, Amritsar and is approved by the Bar Council of India.

The address of the college is not on its website.

History
The foundation stone was laid by Mr S.P Kurdukar, former Supreme Court Judge of India.

External links
 https://stsoldierlawcollege.in/

Law schools in Punjab, India
Education in Jalandhar
Educational institutions established in 2004
2004 establishments in Punjab, India